Sinnar Assembly constituency is one of the fifteen constituencies of the Maharashtra Vidhan Sabha located in the Nashik district. It is a part of the Nashik (Lok Sabha constituency) (ST) along with five other assembly constituencies, namely, Nashik East, Nashik Central, Nashik West, Deolali (SC) and Igatpuri (ST).

Members of Assembly 

 1999: Manikrao Kokate, Shiv Sena
 2004: Manikrao Kokate, Shiv Sena
 2009: Manikrao Kokate, Indian National Congress
 2014: Rajabhau Waje, Shiv Sena
 2019: Manikrao kokate, Nationalist Congress Party

See also
 Sinnar

References

Assembly constituencies of Nashik district
Assembly constituencies of Maharashtra